Michelle Kay Hollands (born 1 August 1974 in Palmerston North) is a field hockey player from New Zealand, who was born under her maiden name Turner. She finished in sixth position with the Women's National Team, nicknamed Black Sticks, at the 2000 Summer Olympics in Sydney.

References
 New Zealand Olympic Committee

External links

New Zealand female field hockey players
Field hockey players at the 2000 Summer Olympics
Field hockey players at the 2006 Commonwealth Games
Olympic field hockey players of New Zealand
1974 births
Living people
Sportspeople from Palmerston North
Commonwealth Games competitors for New Zealand